Khomustakh (Xomustaax) is a rural locality (a selo), the only inhabited locality, and the administrative center of Batagaysky Rural Okrug of Ust-Aldansky District in the Sakha Republic, Russia, located  from Borogontsy, the administrative center of the district. Its population as of the 2010 Census was 542, of whom 261 were male and 281 female, down from 639 as recorded during the 2002 Census.

References

Notes

Sources
Official website of the Sakha Republic. Registry of the Administrative-Territorial Divisions of the Sakha Republic. Ust-Aldansky District. 

Rural localities in Ust-Aldansky District